A list of horror films released in 1981.

References

Sources

 
 
 

 
 

 

 
  

Lists of horror films by year
Horror